Catherine Alicia Young (born Yekaterina Jung ; born February 10, 1963) is a Soviet Russian-born American journalist.  Young is primarily known for her writing about feminism and other cultural issues, as well as about Russia and the former Soviet Union. She is the author of two books, a frequent contributor to the libertarian monthly Reason, and a regular columnist for Newsday. In 2022, she joined The Bulwark as a staff writer. She describes her political views as "libertarian/conservative".

Life and career 
Born in Moscow to a Jewish family, Ekaterina Jung was 17 when her family emigrated to the United States in 1980. She became a naturalized citizen in 1987 as Catherine Alicia Young and graduated from Rutgers University in 1988. At Rutgers, she wrote a column for the student newspaper The Daily Targum and worked as a student writer for The Detroit News. She also completed her autobiography, Growing Up in Moscow: Memories of a Soviet Girlhood, published in 1989.

Continuing her association with The Detroit News, Young was a regular columnist for the newspaper from 1993 to 2000 and worked as a freelance journalist for a variety of publications including The New York Times, The Washington Post, The Philadelphia Inquirer, Newsday, The New Republic, The Wall Street Journal, The American Spectator, National Review, Salon, The Weekly Standard, and Reason.

From 2000 to 2007, Young wrote a weekly op-ed column for The Boston Globe. In 2008, she began writing a regular column for RealClearPolitics.com. In 2012, she became a weekly columnist for Newsday. Over her career, Young has had a close association with Reason, being a contributing editor and a monthly columnist from 2001 to 2007. Since 2014, she has regularly contributed to Time magazine.

Young's writing covers a variety of topics in politics and culture, with particular focus on gender issues and feminism, reflecting an individualist feminist perspective like Wendy McElroy, frequently agreeing with men's rights activists while criticizing them for emulating the identity politics associated with some forms of feminism. In addition to appearing on a number of radio and television shows, she has spoken on college campuses and, during 2001 and 2002, taught a 3-week gender issues course at Colorado College.

Feminism

Views
In her second book, Ceasefire!: Why Women and Men Must Join Forces to Achieve True Equality, published in 1999, Young criticized both feminism and traditionalism from what she described as a "pro-equality point of view", a philosophy which she says may be called "feminism or something else". Young has defended the social media campaign Women Against Feminism.

Describing the Gamergate controversy in relation to feminism, Young has stated that she believes that Gamergate is a backlash against feminism, but "it's a backlash against a particular kind of feminism, one that has a tendency to look obsessively for offences, read ideology into everything, and demonize male sexuality under the pretext of stamping out 'the objectification of women'."

In 2015, Young wrote an article in The Daily Beast in which she interviewed the student whom anti-rape activist Emma Sulkowicz accused of rape. In a response, Sulkowicz described Young as an "anti-feminist", saying that Young published Facebook conversations between her and her alleged rapist to shame her. Heather Wilhelm wrote in RealClearPolitics that Young's article about Sulkowicz "sets aside the hype and soberly assesses the facts." Citing Young's article, Katie Zavadski described her in New York magazine as a "contrarian feminist".

Young supports legally recognizing same-sex marriages. She describes her political views as "libertarian/conservative".

Reception
In his book The Blank Slate, Steven Pinker identifies Young as an "equity feminist", and further describes her as an "iconoclastic columnist" who has argued against rape-related "dogma". She has also written stories critical of campus anti-rape activism. Commentary magazine stated that Young re-investigates "atrocious coverage of campus sexual assault myths" in the "hopes of setting the record straight and minimizing some of the incredible damage the accusations have done".

Bibliography 
 Growing Up In Moscow: Memories of a Soviet Girlhood (1989)
 Ceasefire!: Why Women and Men Must Join Forces to Achieve True Equality (1999)

References

External links 
 Young's collected writings at Reason magazine website
 Young's website
 

1963 births
Living people
American women bloggers
American bloggers
American columnists
American feminists
American libertarians
American memoirists
American political writers
20th-century American Jews
Jewish feminists
Jewish women writers
Cato Institute people
Feminist bloggers
Feminist critics of feminism
Individualist feminists
Rutgers University alumni
Soviet emigrants to the United States
The Boston Globe people
The American Spectator people
Writers from Moscow
21st-century American non-fiction writers
20th-century American women writers
American women memoirists
American women columnists
Naturalized citizens of the United States
21st-century American women writers
21st-century American Jews